Cecilia Mujica (died 1813), nicknamed as The Martyr of Freedom, is a Venezuelan heroine noted for her support for the country's independence and her work with the independence forces. Born in San Felipe, she was the daughter of the loyalist, Martín de Mújica who had been a victim of the earthquake of 1812. After a death decree was issued by Simon Bolívar in 1813, she was executed by firing squad during the Venezuelan War of Independence by Spanish forces in Los Zunzunes, Yaracuy.

References

1813 deaths
People from San Felipe, Venezuela
People executed by Spain by firing squad
Women in the Venezuelan War of Independence
Year of birth missing
Executed Venezuelan people